The 61st Massachusetts General Court, consisting of the Massachusetts Senate and the Massachusetts House of Representatives, met in 1840 during the governorship of Marcus Morton. Daniel P. King served as president of the Senate and Robert Charles Winthrop served as speaker of the House.

On January 22, 1840, the governor gave a speech.

Senators

Representatives

 Amos Binney 
 George T. Bigelow

See also
 26th United States Congress
 List of Massachusetts General Courts

References

External links
 
 

Political history of Massachusetts
1840
massachusetts
1840 in Massachusetts